The 2000–01 Welsh Alliance League is the 17th season of the Welsh Alliance League, which is in the third level of the Welsh football pyramid.

The league consists of fourteen teams and concluded with Llanfairpwll as champions and promoted to the Cymru Alliance.

Teams
Halkyn United were champions in the previous season and were promoted to the Cymru Alliance.

Llandyrnog United were relegated to the Clwyd League and replaced by Gwynedd League champions, Bethesda Athletic and Clwyd League champions, Abergele Town.

Grounds and locations

League table

References

External links
Welsh Alliance League

Welsh Alliance League seasons
3
Wales